The Department of Human Services and Health was an Australian government department that had existed between December 1993 and March 1996.

The Department was created when the Department of Health, Housing, Local Government and Community Services changed its name.

Scope
Information about the department's functions and/or government funding allocation could be found in the Administrative Arrangements Orders, the annual Portfolio Budget Statements and in the Department's annual reports.

According to the Administrative Arrangements Order (AAO) made on 15 December 1993, the Department dealt with:
Services for the aged, people with disabilities and families with children 
Community support services 
Housing 
Public health and medical research 
Health promotion and disease prevention
Pharmaceutical benefits
Health benefits schemes
Specific health services, including human quarantine 
National drug abuse strategy
Matters relating to local government.

Structure
The Department was an Australian Public Service department, staffed by officials who were responsible to the Minister.

The Secretary of the Department was Anthony Stuart Cole (until July 1994) and then Stephen Duckett.

References

Ministries established in 1993
Human Services and Health
1993 establishments in Australia
1996 disestablishments in Australia
Government agencies disestablished in 1996